Cophomantella osphrantica is a moth in the family Lecithoceridae. It was described by Edward Meyrick in 1929. It is known from Chennai, India.

The wingspan is about 16 mm. The forewings are rather light glossy grey with the discal stigmata moderately large, cloudy and dark grey. The hindwings are rather thinly scaled and light grey.

References

Moths described in 1929
Cophomantella
Taxa named by Edward Meyrick